General elections were held in Fiji between 23 and 30 May 1992.  It was the first election held since two military coups in 1987 had severed Fiji's 113-year-old constitutional links with the British Monarchy, and later Fijian Monarchy, and ushered in a republic.

The 1992 elections were the first to be held under the new electoral system, which was deliberately biased in favour of ethnic Fijians.  National constituencies, elected by universal suffrage and comprising almost half of the House of Representatives under the 1970 constitution, were abolished, and for the first time, all members of the House of Representatives were elected from communal constituencies on closed electoral rolls, for registered members of a particular ethnic group.  37 seats were allocated to ethnic Fijians and only 27 to Indo-Fijians, despite the near-equality of their numbers in the population; one seat was reserved for a representative of the Rotuman Islanders, with five constituencies reserved for General electors (an omnibus category for various minorities including Europeans, Chinese, and Banaban Islanders).

The Soqosoqo ni Vakavulewa ni Taukei led by Sitiveni Rabuka, who had instigated the 1987 coups, won 30 of the 38 seats reserved for ethnic Fijians and Rotuman; the remaining five were won by the extremist Fijian Nationalist Party of Sakeasi Butadroka.  The 27 Indo-Fijian electorates were almost equally divided, with the National Federation Party winning 14 seats and the Fiji Labour Party 13.  All five of the "general electorates" were won by the General Voters Party.

Results

See also
List of members of the Parliament of Fiji (1992–1994)

References

Elections in Fiji
Fiji
General
Fiji